St Columb Green Book is a very rare 16th century handwritten manuscript, bound in green leather detailing the parish records of St Columb Major, Cornwall. It was kept with a few intermissions from 1585 onwards. It gives a rare glimpse in day to day life in 16th century Cornwall. The original is very fragile and is now kept at Cornwall Record Office. A reprint of selected passages was published in 1912 by Thurstan Peter, in a Supplement to Journal of Royal Institution of Cornwall, vol. 19.

The book dating back to Elizabethan times covers just the Parish of St Columb Major. It is important, as it contains one of the earliest references to Morris dancing  in the United Kingdom. Another entry gives the earliest written reference to the ancient sport of Cornish Hurling Also contained is an early reference to Robin Hood plays that existed in Cornwall.

Extracts of note
1585: (Early evidence of Morris dancing) coats for dancers, a friars coat, 24 dancing bells, a streamer of red mocaddo and lockram, 6 yards of white woolen cloth
1588 (In the year of the Armada) - Stock of money for the trayned (sic) soldiers
1589 Rec. for the lont of Robbyn Hood clothes
1593 Parish Carriage available for hire. Built by Remfray Rowse and Harry Hawke
1595  'sylver ball gylt' (earliest record of the Hurling game at St Columb which still exists)
1678: ffor ye burying of Peter the son of Sir John SeyntAubyn 13s 4d
1715: Pd Mr Robert Creeper in full for transcribing the Kings Letter £2 10s

References

Further reading
 The St Columb Green Book', Supplement to the Journal of the Royal Institute of Cornwall, 19 (1912) Covers period 1585 to 1687.

External links
  Description of the Green Book held by Cornwall Council
Morris and Guize Dance traditions in Cornwall from the 'An Daras' webpage  Includes a mention of the Green Book

16th-century manuscripts
17th-century manuscripts
St Columb Major